Piz Zupò (3,996 m) is a mountain in the Bernina Range of the Alps, located on the border between Switzerland and Italy. It lies between the valleys of Morteratsch (Graubünden) and Malenco (Lombardy). Piz Zupò is the second highest peak in the range after Piz Bernina.

The first ascent of the mountain was made by L. Enderlin and Serardi, with Badrutt (a chamois hunter) on 9 July 1863.

See also

List of mountains of the Alps above 3000 m
List of mountains of Switzerland

References

 Collomb, Robin, Bernina Alps, Goring: West Col Productions, 1988

External links

 Bernina Range on SummitPost
 Piz Zupò on Hikr

Bernina Range
Engadin
Pontresina
Mountains of the Alps
Alpine three-thousanders
Mountains of Italy
Mountains of Switzerland
Italy–Switzerland border
International mountains of Europe
Mountains of Graubünden
Three-thousanders of Switzerland